Morehead is a surname. Notable people with the surname include:
 Albert Hodges Morehead (1909–1966), American writer on the game of bridge for The New York Times
Albert Hodges Morehead's son Philip Morehead (born 1942), American musician formerly of Chicago, now residing in Canada.
 Boyd Dunlop Morehead (1843–1905), Premier of Queensland, Australia, 1888–1890
 Dave Morehead (born 1942), former Major League Baseball pitcher
 Patricia S. Morehead (born 1938), American educator and politician
 William Morehead (1737–1793), Scottish landowner
 William Morehead's son Robert Morehead (1777–1842), Scottish clergyman and poet
 Robert Morehead's son William Ambrose Morehead (1805–1863), Scottish member of the Indian Civil Service who acted as the Governor of Madras
 Robert Morehead's son Charles Morehead (1807–1882), Scottish physician who served in the Indian Medical Service

See also
 Moorehead
 Muirhead